Marie-Dominique Philippe (8 September 1912 in Nord (French department) – 26 August 2006 in Loire) was a Dominican philosopher and theologian.

He was ordained in 1936. He was a professor of philosophy at the University of Fribourg from 1945 to 1982 where he held the chair of Metaphysics. Before the alleged sexual allegations, he was considered one of the most important French catholic theologians after Vatican II. While remaining a Dominican friar he founded the Community of St. John in 1975. In 2013, the Prior General, Br. Thomas Joachim, made known the first complaints of sexual abus against fr. Philippe.

Life
Marie-Dominique Philippe was born on 8 September 1912 at Cysoing, France, the eighth of twelve children. From the age of six, Philippe read for his uncle, Dominican Father , who was going blind. After having completed his secondary education with the Jesuits at Lille, he entered the Order of Preachers (the Dominicans) in November 1930 at Amiens. He pronounced his religious vows in November 1931, and pursued his studies in philosophy and theology at the Saulchoir in Kain (Belgium) from 1931 to 1938. He was ordained priest in July 1936. Having first graduated in philosophy ("Wisdom in Aristotle" being the subject of his lectorat dissertation) he went on to complete a doctorate in theology.

After obtaining an additional diploma of Higher Studies, he taught philosophy and theology at the Saulchoir at Étiolles (the Dominican House of Studies of the Paris Province) from 1939 to 1945 and again from 1951 to 1962, and philosophy at the University of Fribourg (Switzerland) from 1945 to 1982. From 1982 until two months before his death on 26 August 2006, he continued teaching philosophy and theology at the houses of studies of the Congregation of Saint John in France.

Congregation of St John
During the summer of 1975, five students began to live a communal life. Father Philippe would visit once a week to provide "spiritual direction". The students asked Philippe for assistance in forming a religious community. The brothers initially lived at the monastery of Lerins, where they drew inspiration from Pope Paul VI's "Evangelii Nuntiandi". In 1978 they took the name "Community of Saint John". Fr. Philippe drafted a rule of life based in part on the prayer of Christ in Chapter 17 of Saint John's Gospel.

Two branches of nuns were also established, the contemplative in 1982, and the apostolic in 1984.

Father Philippe died peacefully on the morning of Saturday 26 August 2006, at the priory of Saint Jodard (France). He had been cared for there since his stroke on 20 July. He would have been 94 years old on 8 September.

Sexual abuse allegations
The Community of St. Jean admitted in 2013 that Philippe had behaved "in ways that went against chastity" with several adult women.

In June 2016, Father Philippe was accused of ongoing sexual abuse by a former Carmelite nun who received spiritual direction from him. These accusations came out as part of an investigation into similar allegations against Father Philippe's brother, Father Thomas Philippe.
In February 2019, Pope Francis spoke about a women's religious community which Pope Benedict dissolved, saying that "a certain slavery of women had crept in, slavery to the point of sexual slavery on the part of clergy or the founder." It was further clarified by the Holy See Press Office, that the Pope did not mean "sexual slavery" but rather "manipulation." Following the numerous reactions, the Community has published an official statement on its website, accompanied by a chronology of the events from 2009 to 2014, in relationship with the contemplative sisters of Saint John.

Works
 Mystères de Misericorde (Mary, Mystery of Mercy), 1958
 The Mystery of Joseph
 Retracing Reality, 2001
 L'être
 De L'être à Dieu
 De l'amour
 Suivre l'Agneau
 Un seul Dieu tu adoreras
 Les trois sagesses
 J'ai soif

References

Further reading
 Peltereau-Villeneuve,Benoît-Emmanuel, Schwizgebel,Ariane, Le père Marie-Dominique Philippe, ouvrier de la sagesse, Philippe-Marie Mossu (Preface), Les Plans (Switzerland): Parole et Silence Editions, 2012, 

 Marie-Dominique Philippe : au coeur de l'église du XXe siècle, ecrit par Marie-Christine Lafon, Paris: Desclee de Brouwer, 2015, .

See also
Religieuses abusées, l'autre scandale de l'Église

External links 
Community of St. John in the United States
Website in defense of Father Philippe
Website about Father Philippe mdphilippe.over-blog.com

French Dominicans
Founders of Catholic religious communities
1912 births
2006 deaths
Catholic Church sexual abuse scandals in France
Sexual abuse of women in the Catholic Church